This is a list of monuments in Fontana, Gozo, Malta, which are listed on the National Inventory of the Cultural Property of the Maltese Islands.

List 

|}

Notes

References

Fontana, Gozo
Fontana, Gozo